Lucas Cassius Gatti  (born 14 February 1978) is a retired Argentine football midfielder who played for Argentinos Juniors, Dundee F.C. and CD Badajoz. He is currently the U23 manager at Bromley.

References

External links
 Argentine Primera statistics  
 

Footballers from Buenos Aires
Argentine footballers
Argentine expatriate footballers
Association football midfielders
Argentinos Juniors footballers
CD Badajoz players
Dundee F.C. players
Argentine Primera División players
Scottish Premier League players
Expatriate footballers in Scotland
Expatriate footballers in Spain
Argentine expatriate sportspeople in Spain
Argentine expatriate sportspeople in Scotland
1978 births
Living people